Danuria contorta is a species of praying mantis in the family Deroplatyidae. It is found in Kenya and Tanzania.

See also
List of mantis genera and species

References

Danuria
Insects described in 1912